"1%" is the fourth solo single by Tomomi Itano (a Japanese idol, a member of AKB48). It was released in Japan on June 12, 2013, on the label You, Be Cool! (a subsidiary of King Records).

The physical CD single reached fourth place in the Japanese Oricon weekly singles chart.

Background 
The single was released in four versions: Type A, Type B, a regular edition, and a theater edition.

Track listing

Type A

Type B

Regular Edition

Theater Edition

Charts

References

External links 
 Type A at Sony Music

2013 singles
Songs with lyrics by Yasushi Akimoto
Tomomi Itano songs
King Records (Japan) singles
2013 songs